The hock, or gambrel, is the joint between the tarsal bones and tibia of a digitigrade or unguligrade quadrupedal mammal, such as a horse, cat, or dog.   This joint may include articulations between tarsal bones and the fibula in some species (such as cats), while in others the fibula has been greatly reduced and is only found as a vestigial remnant fused to the distal portion of the tibia (as in horses). It is the anatomical homologue of the ankle of the human foot.  While homologous joints occur in other tetrapods, the term is generally restricted to mammals, particularly long-legged domesticated species.

Horse
Although the tarsus refers specifically to the bones and joints of the hock, most people working with horses refer to the hock in such a way to include the bones, joints, and soft tissue of the area. The hock is especially important in equine anatomy, due to the great strain it receives when the horse is worked. Jumping, and movements that require collection, are some of the more stressful activities.

Primary joints and bones of the hock
In the horse, the hock consists of multiple joints, namely:
Tibiotarsal or tarsocrural joint
Proximal intertarsal joint or talocalcanealcentroquartal joint
Distal intertarsal joint or centrodistal joint
Tarsometatarsal joint
Talocalcaneal joint

In the horse, the hock consists of the following bones:
Talus
Calcaneus
Central tarsal bone
Fused 1st and 2nd tarsal bone
3rd tarsal bone
4th tarsal bone
2nd metatarsal bone
3rd metatarsal bone
4th metatarsal bone

Equine disease states
Horses may suffer from  "capped hock", which is caused by the creation of a false bursa, a synovial sac beneath the skin. Capped hock is usually caused by trauma such as kicking or slipping when attempting to stand. In the absence of a wound, it does not require immediate veterinary attention and is usually only of cosmetic significance. On the other hand, a wound into the calcanean bursa is a serious problem. A capped hock is extremely unlikely to be a cause of lameness, even if severe.
Osteochondrosis dissecans, or OCD is a developmental defect in the cartilage or of cartilage and bone seen in particular locations on the surface of the tarsocrural joint.  This condition is typically discovered when the horse is young, and is one cause of bog spavin.  After surgery to remove bone and cartilage fragments most horses can return to full work.
Distension of the tibiotarsal joint with excessive joint fluid and/or synovium is called bog spavin.
Degenerative joint disease of the tarsometatarsal or distal intertarsal joint is referred to as bone spavin.
Curb, or tarsal plantar desmitis, is traditionally considered a sprain of the plantar ligament, which runs down the back of the hock, serving functionally as a tension band connecting the calcaneus, the fourth tarsal bone and the fourth metatarsal bone.  Recent work has shown that curb can be caused by damage to one of many soft tissue structures in this region.
Stringhalt

Conformational defects
Also see equine conformation

Because the hock takes a great deal of strain in all performance disciplines, correct conformation is essential if the horse is to have a sound and productive working life. Common conformational defects include sickle hocks, post-legged conformation/straight hocks, cow hocks, and bowed hocks. Depending on the use of the horse, some defects may be more acceptable than others.

See also
Ham hock
Ankle
Fetlock
Heel
Limbs of the horse

Zoology
Mammal anatomy
Horse anatomy